Retribution is a 1987 American horror film directed by Guy Magar, written by Magar and Lee Wasserman, and starring Dennis Lipscomb as a suicidal man who is possessed by a vengeful spirit.

Plot 
On Halloween, two men both suffer horrific injuries at the same time: George Miller is hospitalised after he attempts suicide by jumping from a hotel roof, and Vito Minelli dies after being shot multiple times and then set on fire when he angers the mob by being unable to pay off his gambling debts. When George is revived and nursed back to health, he begins to have nightmares about Vito's life.  His psychiatrist, Dr. Curtis, thinks that he's mentally ill, but Lt. Ashley believes that he's responsible for a series of brutal murders.  George eventually discovers that he's been possessed by Vito, who has been killing the gangsters responsible for his own death.

Cast 
 Dennis Lipscomb as George Miller
 Leslie Wing as Dr. Jennifer Curtis
 Suzanne Snyder as Angel
 Jeff Pomerantz as Dr. Alan Falconer 
 George Murdock  as Dr. John Talbot 
 Pamela Dunlap  as Sally Benson 
 Susan Peretz as Mrs. Stoller 
 Clare Peck  as Carla Minelli
 Chris Caputo  as Dylan
 Hoyt Axton as Lt. Ashley
 Ralph Manza as Amos
 Mario Roccuzzo as Johnny Blake 
 Harry Caesar as Charlie 
 Jeffrey Josephson as Joe Martinez
 Tony Cox as Hotel Resident

Production 
Guy Magar said it took three years before he found an investor for the film.  A wealthy businessman finally put up the entire $1.2 million budget.  Filming began in January 1986 and lasted five weeks.

Release 
Retribution screened at the AFI Film Festival of Los Angeles in March 1987.  The film was originally planned for theatrical release in October 1986, but it was delayed.  It had a limited release in June 1987, missed a wide release in October 1987, and was finally scheduled for an October 1988 wide release.

Reception 
Chris Willman of the Los Angeles Times called it "stingy on scares" and poorly plotted.  Daryl Loomis of DVD Verdict wrote, "Retribution is overlong and kind of silly, but offers some imaginative kills; cult horror fans should get a kick out of it. I recommend it mildly to them, but to nobody else."  Empire rated it 3/5 stars and called it "a fun trash movie".  Time Out called it "often scary" but too focused on the human interest elements.

References

External links 
 

1987 films
1987 horror films
1987 independent films
1980s American films
1980s English-language films
1980s supernatural horror films
American independent films
American supernatural horror films
Films directed by Guy Magar
Films scored by Alan Howarth (composer)